Hikaru “Carl” Iwasaki (October 18, 1923 – September 15, 2016) was an American born photographer of Japanese heritage who was sent to the Heart Mountain US internment camp as a teen during World War II following the signing of Executive Order 9066. 

Born in San Jose, California, he "was a photographer in U.S. relocation camps for Japanese citizens during World War II." He was a contributor to Time, Life and Sports Illustrated magazines and photographed politicians and sports celebrities. He also photographed ordinary Japanese-Americans in the aftermath of the World War II internment. He also documented events of the civil rights movement, including the reaction to the Brown vs. the Board of Education in Topeka, Kansas in the 1950s.

Photographs

See also
 Hikaru Iwasaki category on Wikimedia Commons
 Photos of Japanese-American Internment by Hikaru Iwasaki for the War Relocation Authority (WRA) in the National Archives Catalog. 
 Hikaru Iwasaki entry on the Densho Encyclopedia

References 

1923 births
2016 deaths
American photographers
American people of Japanese descent
Japanese-American internees